Kristina Perica (born 5 November 1979) is a Croatian sprinter. She competed in the women's 400 metres at the 2000 Summer Olympics.

References

1979 births
Living people
Athletes (track and field) at the 2000 Summer Olympics
Croatian female sprinters
Olympic athletes of Croatia
Place of birth missing (living people)
Olympic female sprinters